Richard Tallman may refer to:

 Richard C. Tallman (born 1953), American judge
 Richard J. Tallman (1925–1972), U.S. Army general